A Winter Rose is a 2016 American drama and music film written, directed, edited and scored by Riz Story and starring Kimberly Whalen, Paul Sorvino, Robert Miano,  Billy Zane, Taryn Manning, Edward Furlong, and Theresa Russell.

Premise
Winter Rose, a troubled teenage orphan in Los Angeles, is forced to cope with her substance abuse problems when she gets a once in a lifetime chance to become an overnight international singing star.

Cast
Billy Zane	as Preston Holdsworth
Taryn Manning as Patricia Rose
Edward Furlong as Willy
Paul Sorvino as Skippy
Samaire Armstrong	as Simone
Theresa Russell as Rachal Love
Andy Dick as Billy Joe
George Lazenby as Henry
Jack Kehler as Mel Wieser
Carmen Argenziano as Joe
Robert Miano	as Jimmy
Mackenzie Brooke Smith as Young Winter Rose
Rebecca Grant as Celebrity Interviewer
Kim Whalen as Winter Rose

Release
The film was first screened in 2014 at the Dances with Films Festival as the honorary OPENING NIGHT FILM. It was later released in the United States in a limited theatrical release on December 2, 2016.  The Director's Cut version of the film was released in 2019 and features additional scenes and music.

Critical reception
The film was reviewed and written about in a wide range of publications including LA 411, who said, "Riz Story embodies Indie Spirit in A Winter Rose".  Other coverage includes the Los Angeles Times, IndieWire, AM/FM Magazine, Soul Citi, and DesiMag.

Music
The original soundtrack from A Winter Rose features 26 original songs, performed by the cast.  24 of these original songs were written by director Riz Story, who also produced and mixed the album.  6 of the songs have been released as singles with all six having entered the Billboard Hot Singles Sales Charts Top Ten, including a #1 single and a #2 single.

References

External links

 

2014 films
American independent films
American musical drama films
Films shot in Los Angeles
2010s English-language films
2010s American films